Suravali railway station (its name is mainly spelt as Seraulim locally) is a smaller railway station in Goa.

Administration
The station falls under the jurisdiction of Konkan Railway. It lies along the Margao to Betalbatim road, at Seraulim village and is under Karwar railway region of Konkan Railway zone, a subsidiary zone of Indian Railways. Suravali uses the four-letter code of SRVX.

Location and structure
It has two platforms. It has a dual broad-gauge track, and is considered a "halt" station. There are 14 trains which halt here, but no originating or terminating trains in this rather small station. It is located in the Salcete taluka of Goa.

Other stations
Madgaon (Margao) railway station in South Goa district is the largest Konkan Railway station within Goa, while Thivim railway station in North Goa comes at second place. The former is a gateway to South Goa, Margao, the urban area of Vasco da Gama and also the beaches of South Goa, while the latter is a gateway to Mapusa town, the emigration-oriented sub-district of Bardez and also the North Goa beach belt. The Karmali railway station is closest to State capital Panjim or Panaji, which is the administrative capital of Goa.

References

Railway stations in South Goa district
Railway stations along Konkan Railway line
Railway stations opened in 1997
Karwar railway division